The Isaac Davis Trail, also known as the Acton Trail, is an historic  trail running east–west in the towns of Acton and Concord, Massachusetts.  The trail was significant in 1775 when it was used by Captain Isaac Davis and the Acton Minutemen to march on Concord during the battles of Lexington and Concord. The trail was added to the National Register of Historic Places in 1972.

The trail begins at Isaac Davis' house in Acton, and ends at western end of the North Bridge in the Minuteman National Historical Park in Concord. Most of the route is now paved roads, where in some cases the alignment no longer matches the exact route. Despite this, the trail route evokes the time of the march, with its roadways lined with stone walls, and houses generally set back from the street. It crosses Lowell Rd, following Barnes Hill Rd and crossing Liberty Rd to reach the Muster Field above the North Bridge.

Events
The Isaac Davis Trailmarch is held each year on Patriots' Day.

See also
National Register of Historic Places listings in Concord, Massachusetts

References

National Register of Historic Places in Middlesex County, Massachusetts
National Register of Historic Places in Concord, Massachusetts
Geography of Middlesex County, Massachusetts
Acton, Massachusetts